Jonathan Adjo Kodjia (born 22 October 1989) is a professional footballer who plays as a forward for Umm Salal in the Qatar Stars League. Born in France, he represents the Ivory Coast national team at International level.

Kodjia started his career at Reims and gained experience in the Championnat National (French third division) and Ligue 2 with Cherbourg, Caen and Amiens. Kodjia moved to Angers in 2014, ultimately winning Ligue 2 Player of the Year 2015 and being named in the Ligue 2 Team of the Season.

Early life
Kodjia was born in Saint-Denis, a commune in the northern suburbs of Paris. After leaving school in 2007, he enrolled at college to build on his baccalaureate in accountancy. At the age of 18, he was approached by an agent who got in touch with him and said he’d seen him playing and found him interesting. The agent then arranged a trial with Ligue 2 side Stade de Reims, where he scored 3 goals and signed a professional contract six months later.

Club career

Reims
Kodjia made his professional debut in a 4–1 loss against Dijon. In the first four seasons at the club, Kodjia rarely played and was never able to score for the Reims first team, his most productive campaign being when he made 13 appearances after the club had dropped into France's third tier. Successful loan moves to Cherbourg, Caen and Amiens earned him a move to Angers.

Angers
Kodjia moved to Angers in 2014 where he won the Ligue 2 Player of the Year 2015 and was also named in the Ligue 2 Team of the Season, after scoring 15 goals in 29 games during the 2014–15 Ligue 2 to help Angers gain promotion to the French top flight after finishing in 3rd place. On 1 August 2014, he made his Angers debut in a 3–2 away loss against Nîmes, also scoring his first two goals for the club in the same game.

Bristol City
Kodjia joined Bristol City on a three-year deal for £2 million from Angers, with the option of a further year on 20 July 2015. He scored his first competitive goal for Bristol City on 15 August 2015 in a 4–2 defeat to Brentford, converting a pass from Luke Ayling to give City a 1–0 lead. He scored 20 goals in 48 appearances in his debut season at Bristol City.

Aston Villa
On 30 August 2016, Kodjia signed with Aston Villa on a four-year contract for an initial fee of £11 million, that could potentially rise to £15 million. He scored his first league goal for the club, in his second game, against Brentford. Kodjia's next goal came in a 1–1 draw against Wolverhampton Wanderers from the spot after Jack Grealish was fouled in Steve Bruce's first game as Villa manager. He then scored the opener in a 2–1 win away at Reading just three days later. His late acrobatic goal against Fulham on 22 October won the game 1–0 for Villa, making it three goals in three games and back to back wins for the club.

Kodjia started November in top form bagging two goals against a struggling Blackburn Rovers on side on Bonfire night to help Villa come from 1–0 down to win the game 2–1. His seventh goal of the season then came later in the month with a fine header in a 3–1 win over Cardiff City at Villa Park. Kodjia scored six goals in Steve Bruce's first seven games in charge and his form helped propel Villa from the relegation zone up to 11th within Bruce's first month at the club. Kodjia's performances won him the PFA Championship player of the month for November. He broke his ankle in April 2017, which prematurely ended his season and would see him miss the beginning of the 2017–18 season. He finished the season with 19 goals in 36 games in his first season.

Kodja injured his ankle again in the derby match against Birmingham City in October 2017 which was further aggravated on international duty, the injury required surgery which ruled him out until March 2018. He returned from injury to help Villa reach the 2018 EFL Championship play-off Final, playing in the final as a substitute, as Villa lost 1–0 to Fulham in the final and thus missed out on promotion to the Premier League.

2018–19 season
On 22 April 2019, Kodjia scored the only goal in a 1–0 win over Millwall which helped the club set a new record of ten successive wins. On 28 April 2019, he was injured while playing against Leeds United in the EFL Championship. With Villa players wanting the ball put out of play so that Kodjia could receive treatment, Leeds continued playing and scored. Following the goal, there was a large confrontation between the opposing sides, which lead the Leeds coach, Marcelo Bielsa, to allow Aston Villa to equalise unchallenged.

Al-Gharafa
On 19 January 2020, Kodjia was presented to the media by Al-Gharafa in the Qatar Stars League, coached by former Premier League manager Slaviša Jokanović. On 23 January 2020, he made his debut in a 4–2 win over Al-Rayyan, in which he scored a hat-trick.

Umm Salal 
In July 2022, Kodjia signed for fellow Qatar Stars League club Umm Salal. He made his debut on 1 August 2022, in a 1–0 defeat to Al Ahli.

International career
Kodjia was born in France to Ivorian parents. He was contacted first by the Benin Football Association as his surname has origins in that country, but was not eligible. He was later called up by the Ivory Coast national team in May 2016 and made his debut in a friendly versus Hungary in a 0–0 draw. He scored his first international goal against Gabon on 4 June 2016, volleying home to score the first goal of the game. Ivory Coast would go on to win 2–1.

Career statistics

Club

International

Scores and results list Ivory Coast's goal tally first, score column indicates score after each Kodjia goal.

Honours
Angers
Ligue 2 third-place promotion: 2014–15

Aston Villa
EFL Championship play-offs: 2019

Individual
Ligue 2 Player of the Year: 2015
Ligue 2 Team of the Season: 2014–15
EFL Championship PFA Player of the Month: November 2016

References

External links

Jonathan Kodjia at Foot-National.com

1989 births
Living people
Sportspeople from Saint-Denis, Seine-Saint-Denis
French footballers
Citizens of Ivory Coast through descent
Ivorian footballers
Ivory Coast international footballers
Association football forwards
Stade de Reims players
AS Cherbourg Football players
Amiens SC players
Stade Malherbe Caen players
Angers SCO players
Bristol City F.C. players
Aston Villa F.C. players
Al-Gharafa SC players
Umm Salal SC players
Ligue 2 players
Championnat National players
Championnat National 3 players
English Football League players
Premier League players
Qatar Stars League players
2017 Africa Cup of Nations players
2019 Africa Cup of Nations players
French expatriate footballers
Ivorian expatriate footballers
Expatriate footballers in England
Expatriate footballers in Qatar
French expatriate sportspeople in England
Ivorian expatriate sportspeople in England
French expatriate sportspeople in Qatar
Ivorian expatriate sportspeople in Qatar
French sportspeople of Ivorian descent
Footballers from Seine-Saint-Denis